Exo (public transit) Sainte-Julie sector is the public transportation service for the small city of Sainte-Julie in southwestern Quebec, Canada.

The system provides a mix of regular transit bus and commuter express services, with most routes terminating either at Longueuil bus station or in downtown Montreal in front of 800, rue De La Gauchetière Ouest, across the street from  Gare Centrale and near Terminus Centre-Ville. Agence métropolitaine de transport park and ride facilities for commuters, are located at 211 boulevard Armand-Frappier. Industrial and rural areas of Sainte-Julie are served by taxibus.

The Marguerite-D'Youville Regional County Municipality manages the transportation for people with disabilities within the Region. To be eligible for this service, one must complete the application form and be approved.

Bus routes

See also 
 Exo (public transit) bus services
 List of Agence métropolitaine de transport park and ride lots

References

External links
 AMT site for Sainte-Julie

Transit agencies in Quebec
Bus transport in Quebec
Transport in Montérégie
Sainte-Julie, Quebec